Sohr va Firuzan (also Romanized as Sohr va Fīrūzān; also known as Fīrūzān, Safiruzān, Safīvazān, Sohr-e Fīrūzān, and Sohr Fīrūzān) is a village in Sohr va Firuzan Rural District, Pir Bakran District, Falavarjan County, Isfahan Province, Iran. At the 2006 census, its population was 3,628, in 1,030 families.

References 

Populated places in Falavarjan County